Rohit Chadda (born 26 August 1982) is an Indian investment banker and entrepreneur, who serves as the CEO of the digital business at Essel Group (Zee Entertainment, Zee Media and DNA). He was the co-founder of online food ordering platform Foodpanda. He is also the founder of omni-channel digital payments platform PayLo. He has been attributed for the turnaround of Zee Digital by bringing the digital business to the second position on ComScore from ninth position making Zee the second largest digital media group in India. He has been featured among Top Tech CEOs of the decade (2010-2020) in India and was featured among Fortune 40 under 40 in 2015.

Education and early career 
Chadda graduated from Delhi Technological University (formerly Delhi College of Engineering) with a degree in computer engineering and worked as a software engineer for Computer Sciences Corporation. In 2007 he joined Indian Institute of Management Calcutta to do his MBA after which he worked at Merrill Lynch as an Investment Banker in United Kingdom. He took an internal transfer to India in 2011.

Career

Foodpanda
Chadda began his career in 2012 when he co-founded foodpanda. foodpanda expanded to around 40 countries before being bought by Delivery Hero. Before foodpanda got popular, he joked that he delivered pizza for a living. foodpanda had raised a total investment of over US$300 million till 2015. Chadda in the middle of 2015 stepped down from day-to-day responsibilities at Foodpanda to launch his digital payments startup. Foodpanda was acquired by its global competitor Delivery Hero in 2016.

Paylo
In 2015, he launched a omni-channel digital payments platform PayLo which acquired the in-restaurant payments app Ruplee in March 2016 for an undisclosed sum. PayLo was successful in the wake of demonetisation in India and expanded pan-India before being acquired by Immortal Technologies. Chadda believes that execution is more important than the idea to make a startup successful and the key challenge for experienced professionals to work in a startup environment is to unlearn what they have previously learned. PayLo acquired Ruplee before being itself acquired by Immortal Technologies.

Zee Group
Chadda took over as CEO of digital publishing of Zee Group in May 2019. Since 2017, he had led global product and strategy for Zee Group launching ZEE5, the flagship OTT of Zee Entertainment, across 170+ countries. Since June 2019, Zee Digital, the online arm of the Zee group, has registered the highest growth year-on-year among the top media publishers in India. Times Internet Limited, Network 18 Group, and India Today Group have grown by 45%, 21%, and 22% respectively from June 2020 over June 2019 while Zee Digital witnessed a growth of 123% over the same period. Zee Digital achieved its first milestone in September 2019 by crossing 100 million unique monthly visitors and was ranked 6th in the news and information category on ComScore India rankings at the time. Later in the month of March 2020 it crossed 150 million unique monthly visitors mark moving to 4th position. Further in May 2020 Zee Digital moved to 3rd position by crossing 185 million unique monthly visitors mark before finally ranking 2nd position in June 2020 in the ComScore rankings among all digital media groups in India.

Chadda has led the transformation of the business of Zee Digital by scaling it to over 200 million users from 60 million users making it the second-largest digital media group in India. He attributes the growth from rank 9 to rank 2 in one year to the data and technology driven approach to content and the focus on vernacular languages. During his tenure, Zee Digital launched 8 new brand websites and 3 new languages to expand the product portfolio to 20 brands and 12 languages. During the US elections in November 2020, Zee Digital launched the English global news channel WION through a digital first approach across Asia Pacific, Middle East, UK and North America.

Chadda launched Zee's UGC short video platform HiPi in the midst of the TikTok ban in India. Hipi was first launched within ZEE5 app ecosystem to capitalise on the reach of the OTT platform. After the success of the POC, he launched a standalone app for HiPi. HiPi is a short video platform that provides a complete video creation ecosystem along with news avenues of monetisation to content creators. He plans to use Zee's network reach of 600 million broadcast viewers and 300 million digital users to get creators on HiPi. HiPi launched India's first digital star hunt to allow users to audition for ZEE5 original shows through the short video platform.

Investing and speaking
Chadda is a mentor at Esselerator, a Startup accelerator by Subhash Chandra Foundation. Esselerator is an initiative by Subhash Chandra, a billionaire Media baron, to promote and support tech entrepreneurs in domains like Media, Fintech and Education. Its powered by TiE Mumbai. Chadda is an angel investor in multiple technology startups like online school aggregator platform SchoolForSure.com. In 2019, he spoke at DPS to students on starting a business. At the time he remained CEO of Zee group's digital business division.

Philanthropy 
Chadda organised a £1 mliion charity bike ride in aid of the British Asian Trust which saw participation by the Prince of Wales. Chadda presented the Prince of Wales with a cycling vest, which was said to be for his grandchildren. Chadda supports a non-profit organisation Mukkamaar founded by Bollywood actress Ishita Sharma that works towards fighting crime against women by teaching free self defence to young girls. He is helping the organisation launch their digital program through a WhatsApp-based chatbot.

Award and recognitions 
 Aditya Birla Award for Business Leadership 2007–08, 2008–09
 Professional Entrepreneur of the Year 2014
 Young Food & Grocery Professional of the Year 2014
 Fortune 40 under 40 most influential business leaders list 2015
 Top 25 Most Talented Ecommerce Professionals in India 2015
Young Entrepreneur of the Year 2016
Exemplary Achievement in Corporate World 2020
Top Tech CEOs of the Decade in India
10 Most Successful Tech CEOs of The Decade
IMPACT Digital Power 100

References 

1982 births
Living people
Delhi Technological University alumni
Indian Institute of Management Calcutta alumni
20th-century Indian businesspeople
Indian chief executives
Indian technology chief executives
Chief executives in the publishing industry
Indian technology businesspeople
Chief executives in the media industry